The Bolivian Athletics Federation (FAB; Federación Atlética de Bolivia) is the governing body for the sport of athletics in Bolivia. Current president is Gonzalo Prado.  He was elected in May 2010.

History 
FAB was founded on February 20, 1929.  First president was Julio de Zabala.

Affiliations 
FAB is the national member federation for Bolivia in the following international organisations:
International Association of Athletics Federations (IAAF)
Confederación Sudamericana de Atletismo (CONSUDATLE; South American Athletics Confederation)
Association of Panamerican Athletics (APA)
Asociación Iberoamericana de Atletismo (AIA; Ibero-American Athletics Association)
Moreover, it is part of the following national organisations:
Bolivian Olympic Committee (Spanish: Comité Olímpico Boliviano)

Members 
FAB comprises the regional associations of Bolivia.

National records 
FAB maintains the Bolivian records in athletics.

References

External links 
  (in Spanish)

Bolivia
Athletics
National governing bodies for athletics
Sports organizations established in 1929